Below is a list of all 171 GWR Castle Class engines, built between August 1923 and August 1950.

Fleet details

References

 
 

 List of GWR 4073 Class
Gwr 4073 Class Locomotives